is a private women's junior college with campuses in Joto-ku and Tsurumi-ku in Osaka, Osaka, Japan. The precursor of the school was founded in 1884, and it was chartered as a university in 1959.

It is affiliated with Osaka Shin-Ai Gakuin.

References

External links 
 Official website 
  Osaka Shin-Ai Joshi Gakuin 

Christianity in Osaka
Private universities and colleges in Japan
Educational institutions established in 1884
Japanese junior colleges
Jōtō-ku, Osaka
Catholic universities and colleges in Japan
Women's universities and colleges in Japan
Universities and colleges in Osaka
1884 establishments in Japan